Movilă is a Romanian language noble surname of the Movilești family (see the list of persons there), a Moldavian boyar family.

Notable modern persons with the surname include:
Boris Movilă, Moldovan writer 
Lică Movilă (born 1961), Romanian footballer
Sanda Movilă (1900-1970), Romanian poet and novelist

See also 
 Movila (disambiguation)
 Movileni (disambiguation)
 Movilița (disambiguation)

Romanian-language surnames